Tanuki may refer to:

Japanese raccoon dog (Nyctereutes viverrinus or Nyctereutes procyonoides viverrinus), a mammal native to Japan
Bake-danuki, a type of spirit (yōkai) in Japanese mythology that appears in the form of the mammal
A deadwood bonsai technique
Tanooki suit, a raccoon-tailed power-up in the Super Mario video game series